The Rolex Oyster Perpetual Datejust is a certified, self-winding chronometer wristwatch manufactured by Rolex.  When it was launched in 1945, the Datejust was the first self-winding chronometer wristwatch to indicate the date in a window on the dial. Today, it exists in a variety of sizes from 28mm to 41mm, in stainless steel, two-tone gold, and solid gold versions.

History
Rolex introduced the original Datejust (reference 4467) in 1945 to celebrate the company's 40th anniversary. It was available only in 18 karat yellow gold and had a small bubble back winder with a deeply domed back. It also featured the company's waterproof Oyster case (first introduced in 1926), a fluted bezel, and the new Jubilee bracelet (so named for the occasion).

Over the years, the Datejust saw an expansion of its design options as well as improvements to its movement, from a gradual date change shortly before midnight in the earliest versions to an instantaneous change beginning in 1955.

The Datejust is offered with two Rolex bracelets: the Jubilee and the Oyster. The original Datejust was launched with a case size of 36mm.  Subsequently, various sizes including ladies' and mid-sized versions were made available.  The Turn-O-Graph model was introduced in 1955 as an award given to US Air Force pilots returning from combat missions. It featured a rotating bezel marked to 60 minutes, which can be used to measure time intervals. Datejust watches of this type have been nicknamed "Thunderbirds".  This watch would form the basis for the Rolex Explorer (designed for Sir Edmund Hillary's Mount Everest expedition), the Rolex Submariner, and the Rolex Sea-Dweller.

In 2009, the Rolex Oyster Perpetual Datejust II was released. At 41mm in diameter (excluding the crown) its case is bigger than the original Datejust.

In 2016, the Rolex Oyster Perpetual Datejust 41 was released. The watch comes in stainless steel, and two-tone stainless steel and 18k yellow or 18k everose gold (Rolex's version of rose gold) bracelets. The 2016 41mm Datejust is on an Oyster or Jubilee bracelet. While the Datejust 41 has a similar-sized 41mm diameter case as the Datejust II, the Datejust 41 has smaller indexes and a thinner bezel compared to the Datejust II.

In this year, Rolex also introduced the new Caliber 3235 movement, which replaces more than 90% of the parts of its predecessor, the Caliber 3135 - Rolex’s longest running and most successful movement. Caliber 3235 includes a new escapement, the Chronergy, along with other significant improvements, and provides a 70-hour power reserve while maintaining the same dimensions as its predecessor.

At Baselworld 2015, Rolex announced that the Lady-Datejust 26mm would be replaced by a newer 28mm variant, with a new Caliber 2236 movement, refined lugs and middle case, a broad and clear dial, as well as a President or Jubilee bracelet integrated into the Oyster case.

As of 2019, the Datejust lineup consists of the following sizes: 28mm, 31mm, 34mm, 36mm, 41mm - which come in either full stainless steel, two-tone gold (yellow, Everose or white) and stainless steel, or solid gold (yellow, Everose and white) case and bracelet.

In popular culture 

In the movie American Psycho, Patrick Bateman (played by Christian Bale) wears the Rolex Datejust 16013 - a two tone, 18ct yellow gold with a champagne coloured  tapestry dial.  The Informers, another movie adapted from Bret Easton Ellis movies, also had some of their cast wearing Datejust watches.

The actor Paul Newman, was seen wearing a full stainless steel 36mm Datejust in The Color of Money.

American actor, Harrison Ford sports a Datejust 36mm in the 1980s movie Frantic, which featured a white Roman numeral dial, white gold bezel and stainless steel jubilee bracelet and case.

Bill Murray's character, wears a Datejust with a black dial in the movie Lost in Translation.

Matthew McConaughey’s character in The Wolf of Wall Street  wears a 90’s Rolesor Datejust.

Notable wearers
The 14th Dalai Lama - Tenzin Gyatso, has a Datejust amongst the watches he owns.
 

Activist and civil rights movement leader, Reverend Dr. Martin Luther King Jr. wore a Datejust reference 1601.

Chinese classical pianist, Yuja Wang, wore the Datejust 31mm.

U.S. first female chief scientist for the National Oceanic and Atmospheric Administration, Sylvia Earle wears a full gold, Lady-Datejust 26mm. 

Peruvian operatic tenor - Juan Diego Flórez has a 36mm, two-tone Rolex Datejust reference 116233 - one of the few Datejust models that utilized the Crownclasp; usually on President and PearlMaster models only.

Presidents Dwight D. Eisenhower, Ronald Reagan and Joe Biden wore the Rolex Datejust while in office. Eisenhower's Datejust had a white Roman numeral dial, a stainless steel engine turned bezel and a steel jubilee bracelet and steel case.

British Prime Minister Winston Churchill was given the 100,000th officially certified chronometer by Rolex's founder, Hans Wilsdorf, while in office during World War II - a 36mm Datejust with a fluted white gold bezel and stainless-steel Jubilee bracelet .

Italian Formula One racing driver Arturo Merzario was given an Oyster Perpetual Datejust by Austrian driver Niki Lauda, for rescuing him from a fiery accident at the 1976 German Grand Prix.

Swiss tennis player, Roger Federer, wore the 41mm Datejust II and is also Rolex's most prominent (paid) “brand ambassador”. 

Australian tennis player, Rod Laver, wears a solid gold, 36mm Datejust. A left-hander, he wears it on his right wrist. 

American tennis player, Chris Evert, wears a solid gold Datejust 31mm. 

German tennis player, Angelique Kerber, wears a Datejust 36mm 

Spanish-Venezuelan tennis player, Garbiñe Muguruza, holds a 36mm Datejust. 

Swedish golfer Annika Sörenstam owns two Datejust watches.

American basketball player Michael Jordan has a two-tone Datejust, amongst many Rolex watches he owns.

References 

Datejust
Products introduced in 1945